The 24th Fujitsu Cup featured 32 players.

Japan (13): Cho Chikun, O Meien, Ogata Masaki, Yuki Satoshi, Yamada Kimio, Hane Naoki, Takao Shinji, Yamashita Keigo, Cho U, Iyama Yuta, Sakai Hideyuki, Fujii Shuya, Seto Taiki
Korea (7): Lee Sedol, Choi Cheol-han, Park Junghwan, Lee Younggu, Heo Yeongho, Kim Jiseok, Kang Yootaek
China (8): Chang Hao, Kong Jie, Qiu Jun, Gu Li, Piao Wenyao, Xie He, Jiang Weijie, Tuo Jiaxi
Taiwan (1): Chen Shien
North America (1): Liu Zhiyuan
South America (1): Fernando Aguilar
Europe (1): Artem Kachanovskyi

Tournament

References

2011 in go
International Go competitions